Lowell Burt Komie (29 December 1927 – 29 October 2015) was an American lawyer and writer.

Born in Chicago, Komie grew up in Milwaukee before moving to Ravinia, later graduating from Highland Park High School in 1945. Komie became famous for his legal fiction works. In 1995 he received the Carl Sandburg Literary Award and the Small Press Award for Fiction in 1998. Komie died on 29 October 2015 in Highwood, Illinois, where he lived.

Selected works
 The Lawyers Chambers and other stories (1995, short story collection)
 The Last Jewish Shortstop in America (1998, novel)

References

1927 births
2015 deaths
20th-century American novelists
American male novelists
Writers from Chicago
Lawyers from Chicago
Legal thrillers
20th-century American short story writers
People from Highland Park, Illinois
People from Highwood, Illinois
20th-century American male writers
Novelists from Illinois
20th-century American lawyers